The 2008 UST Growling Tigers men's basketball team represented University of Santo Tomas in the 71st season of the University Athletic Association of the Philippines. The men's basketball tournament for the school year 2008-09 began on July 5, 2008 and the host school for the season was the University of the Philippines who were celebrating their centennial year.

UST finished fifth at the end of the double round-robin eliminations. They won six games against eight losses. Two of their games went into overtime. The first was an 86–80 win over the Adamson Falcons in the first round, and the other was a 69–74 loss to the FEU Tamaraws in the second round.

The Tigers' second round losses to FEU and to the De La Salle Green Archers meant that they needed to win their last two games to at least tie the UE Red Warriors to gain a playoff for the fourth and final seed heading into the Final Four. They were fifth in the standings at 5 wins and 7 losses, while UE was fourth with a 7–5 record. They were also hoping for the Red Warriors to lose their remaining two games for a playoff to happen.

The game resulted to a two-point loss for UST. The Tigers had struggled throughout the game with errors and inconsistencies. Their opponent had led by 22 points at the end of three quarters. Head coach Pido Jarencio got ejected, but in a display of grit and determination, UST fought back and chipped away at UE's lead, resulting to a 24–1 run. The Tigers who got eliminated ended up scoring 35 points in the fourth quarter.

Season 70 MVP Jervy Cruz was included in the Mythical team selection during the presentation of awards for Season 71. He had played the entire season while nursing a hamstring injury and even led the MVP race at the end of the eliminations with 75.1 statistical points, on top of a double-double average of 19.8 points and 13.7 rebounds per game. He has led the league in rebounds since his first playing year in 2006. The MVP award eventually went to Ateneo's Rabeh Al-Hussaini who was second in running with 71.1 statistical points.

The Growling Tigers was the season's top rebounding team with a 48.4 per game average.

Roster

Depth chart

Roster changes 
The Growling Tigers have lost three of their veterans in center June Dizon, point guards Jun Cortez and Rum Perry Scott, and team captain Anthony Espiritu to graduation and are parading eight new players composed of rookies, transferees and players from the Team B training pool.

Subtractions

Additions

Injuries 
The Growling Tigers did not join any major preseason tournaments on two reasons: their veteran players had been busy playing for their commercial teams in the Philippine Basketball League in the summer; and eight of their players suffered various injures before the UAAP tournament.

Jervy Cruz played in all 14 UAAP games while nursing a pulled hamstring which he incurred while playing for the Hapee Fresh Fighters in an out-of-town game in May.
Dylan Ababou fractured his right hand while playing for the Harbour Centre Batang Pier. He was healed in time for the opening of the season and played in all of UST's games.
Khasim Mirza suffered a broken foot and was also hospitalized before the start of the season due to an improper diet. He missed three games in the first round of eliminations.
Japs Cuan, in only the third game of the Tigers suffered a torn meniscus on his knee which required surgery. He was able to return in the second round while playing limited minutes.
Allein Maliksi had an ACL injury and was only able to play in one game against the NU Bulldogs in the first round of eliminations.
Chester Taylor and Francis Allera had sprained knees during their summer training, while rookie Jeric Fortuna suffered from flu during the season.
Other players who missed games were Mel Gile, Chris Camus, Milan Vargas, and Khasim Mirza. They were all given suspensions by the coaching staff during their first-round game against the Adamson Falcons.

Schedule and results

UAAP games 

Elimination games were played in a double round-robin format and all of UST's games were televised on Studio 23 and Balls.

Postseason tournament

UAAP statistics 

|- bgcolor=#ffffdd
| Jervy Cruz || 14 || || style=|32.5 || 103 || 188 || style=|54.8% || 0 || 0 || 0.0% || 71 || 95 || 74.7% || style=|13.7 || 0.9 || 0.4 || style=|0.9 || 2.4 || style=|19.8
|-
| Dylan Ababou || 14 || || 28.2 || 74 || 163 || 45.4% || 14 || 53 || 26.4% || 58 || 80 || 72.5% || 6.6 || 1.1 || 0.6 || 0.3 || 3.1 || 15.3
|- bgcolor=#ffffdd
| Francis Allera || 14 || || 23.4 || 52 || 139 || 37.4% || 22 || 78 || 28.2% || 13 || 17 || 76.5% || 5.6 || 1.3 || 0.3 || 0.5 || 1.9 || 9.9
|-
| Tata Bautista || 14 || || 15.6 || 31 || 98 || 31.6% || 25 || 82 || 30.5% || 10 || 14 || 71.4% || 1.4 || 1.1 || 0.1 || 0.0 || 1.5 || 6.9
|- bgcolor=#ffffdd
| Khasim Mirza || 11 || || 16.5 || 23 || 74 || 31.1% || 12 || 41 || 29.3% || 13 || 19 || 68.4% || 4.0 || 0.6 || 0.2 || 0.1 || 1.6 || 6.5
|-
| Badong Canlas || 14 || || 21.4 || 32 || 93 || 34.4% || 0 || 1 || 0.0% || 23 || 41 || 56.1% || 4.8 || 1.3 || 0.2 || 0.3 || 1.7 || 6.2
|- bgcolor=#ffffdd
| Japs Cuan || 10 || || 20.3 || 14 || 31 || 45.2% || 1 || 6 || 16.7% || 9 || 20 || 45.0% || 3.8 || style=|4.0 || 0.6 || 0.0 || 1.7 || 3.8
|-
| Jeric Fortuna || 14 || || 15.9 || 15 || 56 || 26.8% || 7 || 23 || 30.4% || 15 || 24 || 62.5% || 1.7 || 1.7 || 0.7 || 0.0 || 1.9 || 3.7
|- bgcolor=#ffffdd
| Allein Maliksi || 1 || || 5.0 || 1 || 3 || 33.3% || 1 || 1 || style=|100.0% || 0 || 0 || 0.0% || 0.0 || 0.0 || style=|1.0 || 0.0 || 0.0 || 3.0
|-
| Chris Camus || 12 || || 8.1 || 14 || 40 || 35.0% || 1 || 11 || 9.1% || 3 || 4 || 75.0% || 1.9 || 0.3 || style=|1.0 || 0.3 || 0.3 || 2.7
|- bgcolor=#ffffdd
| Chester Taylor || 14 || || 11.2 || 14 || 42 || 33.3% || 0 || 2 || 0.0% || 2 || 2 || style=|100.0% || 2.2 || 0.3 || 0.1 || 0.1 || 0.3 || 2.7
|-
| Milan Vargas || 7 || || 6.1 || 6 || 14 || 42.9% || 0 || 1 || 0.0% || 1 || 5 || 20.0% || 0.9 || 0.6 || 0.0 || 0.0 || 0.6 || 2.0
|- bgcolor=#ffffdd
|  || 11 || || 10.2 || 6 || 18 || 33.3% || 1 || 5 || 20.0% || 5 || 10 || 50.0% || 3.3 || 0.9 || 0.1 || 0.4 || 0.8 || 1.6
|-
| Carlos Fenequito || 14 || || 8.0 || 6 || 19 || 31.6% || 2 || 7 || 28.6% || 5 || 6 || 83.3% || 1.6 || 0.6 || 0.1 || 0.1 || 0.5 || 1.4
|- bgcolor=#ffffdd
| Melo Afuang || 5 || || 1.8 || 0 || 3 || 0.0% || 0 || 0 || 0.0% || 2 || 4 || 50.0% || 0.6 || 0.0 || 0.0 || 0.0 || 0.0 || 0.4
|-
| Jackson Wong || 3 || || 1.3 || 0 || 0 || 0.0% || 0 || 0 || 0.0% || 1 || 2 || 50.0% || 0.0 || 0.0 || 0.0 || 0.0 || 0.3 || 0.3
|- class=sortbottom
! Total || 14 ||  || 40.7 || 391 || 982 || 39.8% || 81 || 296 || 27.4% || 231 || 343 || 67.3% || 48.4 || 12.9 || 4.0 || 2.8 || 17.2 || 78.1
|- class=sortbottom
! Opponents || 14 ||  || 40.7 || 369 || 943 || 39.1% || 80 || 294 || 27.2% || 252 || 392 || 64.3% || 39.0 || 14.9 || 4.8 || 4.3 || 14.5 || 75.9
|}

Source: inboundPASS

Awards

Players drafted into the PBA 
Jervy Cruz was picked fourth in the first round of the 2009 PBA draft by the Caloy Garcia-led Rain or Shine Elasto Painters team on August 2, 2009. Francis Allera was also selected in the same rookie draft as the 13th overall pick by the Yeng Guiao-coached Burger King Whoppers before getting traded to the Coca-Cola Tigers.

References 

UST Growling Tigers basketball team seasons